A list of films produced in South Korea in 1971:

References

External links
1971 in South Korea

 1970-1979 at www.koreanfilm.org

1971
South Korean
1971 in South Korea